The Democratic Front for the Liberation of Angola (FDLA) was a political movement in colonial Angola. FDLA was set up as a parallel structure to the People's Movement for the Liberation of Angola (MPLA), supported by the government of Congo-Brazzaville. FDLA later aligned itself with MPLA in the struggle against Portuguese colonial rule. Eventually the cadres of FDLA joined MPLA, and FDLA ceased its independent existence.

Defunct political parties in Angola
MPLA
National liberation movements in Africa
Political parties with year of disestablishment missing
Political parties with year of establishment missing
Rebel groups in Angola